Moon Song or Moonsong may refer to:

Music

Songs
"Moon Song" (song), a 1932 jazz standard written by Arthur Johnston and Sam Coslow
"The Moon Song", written by Karen O and Spike Jonze for the 2013 film Her
"Moon Song", by America from Homecoming, 1972
"Moon Song", by Doctor and the Medics from Laughing at the Pieces, 1986
"Moon Song", by Phoebe Bridgers from Punisher, 2020
"Moonsong", by John Gordon, 2009
"Moonsong", by Parokya ni Edgar from Gulong Itlog Gulong, 1999
"Moonsong", from Cyrano: The Musical, 1992
"Moonsong: Pelog", by Joe Byrd from The American Metaphysical Circus, 1969

Albums
Moon Song, by Dan Barrett, 1998
Moonsong, by Adrian von Ziegler, 2016

Literature
The Hunters: Moonsong, a 2012 Vampire Diaries novel in the Hunters trilogy
Moonsong and Other Poems, a 1962 poetry collection by Ray Mathew
"Moonsong", a poem by Hilda Conkling
Moonsong, a daughter of Riverwind and Goldmoon, fictional characters in the Dragonlance franchise

See also
 Moon (disambiguation) § Songs